Amorphia is an Indian thrash metal band from Kerala, India, formed in 2012. The band is influenced by German and American metal bands such as Sodom, Kreator, Accuser, Demolition Hammer and Slayer.

Performances
In 2019 February and 2020 February, the band did two consecutive Japan tours including True thrash fest 11th edition (2019) and 12th edition (2020).

Releases

Amorphia have released two albums, three singles and are working on their 3rd studio album. They released their first single Master of death in 2014 which quickly spread like wildfire through the Indian metal underground and other parts of the world. In April 2018 , the band released their debut album Arms to Death and in 2020 the band released their second album Merciless strike.

Discography

Arms to Death (2014) 
Merciless Strike (2020)
Lethal Dose (2022)

Band Members

Vasuchandran MV: Vocals, guitar
Vivek Prasad: Drums

See also

Indian rock
Kryptos (band)
Bhayanak Maut
Nicotine (band)
Inner Sanctum (band)
Scribe (band)
Demonic Resurrection

References

External links
Facebook page of Amorphia

Indian heavy metal musical groups
Thrash metal musical groups
Music bands from Kerala
Musical quartets